Mark Gehring (born April 16, 1964) is a former American football tight end who played for the Houston Oilers of the National Football League (NFL). He played college football at Eastern Washington University.

References 

1964 births
Living people
People from Burien, Washington
Sportspeople from King County, Washington
American football tight ends
Eastern Washington Eagles football players
Houston Oilers players